William McQuhae or M'Quhae (1737–1823)  was a senior Scottish clergyman in the Church of Scotland who by the time of his death was Father of the Church. He is one of the few persons to have declined the offer to be Moderator of the General Assembly. He was a member of the New Light Movement. He is mentioned within the poems of Robert Burns.

Life

He was born in Wigtown on 1 May 1737 the son of David McQuhae, a local magistrate and his wife Margaret Laurie.

In his youth in Edinburgh he was tutor to David Boswell and John Boswell, the younger brothers of James Boswell who was a close friend to McQuhae.

He studied at the University of Glasgow and was licensed by the Presbytery of Wigtown to preach as a Church of Scotland minister on 24 March 1762. He served as assistant in St Quivox to George Reid. On Reid's death in 1763 McQuhae was presented as the new minister of St Quivox by James Murray of Broughton. He was formally ordained in the position on 1 March 1764.

In June 1794 St Andrews University awarded him a Doctor of Divinity. In 1806 he declined the position of Moderator of the General Assembly and the post was instead given to Rev William Taylor of St Enoch's Church in Glasgow.

He died as Father of the Church on 1 March 1823, on the 59th anniversary of his ordination.

Family

He married twice: firstly in November 1765 to Elizabeth Park daughter of William Park of Barkip. They had several children, most of whom died young: Richard McQuhae (1766–1805) died in Jamaica; Sarah (1769–1778); Margaret (1770–1836); David (1773–1775); Elizabeth (1774–1778); Glencairn (daughter) (1776–1802); Charles (daughter) (1778–1855) married Alexander McDowal.

Following his wife's death he married Mary Lawrie (died 1824) in June 1782. They had several more children: Mary (born 1783) married John Stirling, minister of Craigie, Elizabeth (born 1784); Lydia Wills McQuhae (born 1785) married Thomas Ainsworth of Blackburn; William McQuhae (1787–1824) a Major in the British Army died in Calcutta; Patrick (born 1788); James (1790–1819); Stair Park McQuhae (1795–1872) succeeded his father as minister of St Quivox; Laura Macrae McQuhae (1798–1802).

The family continued to live in the manse after William's death (with his son as minister) and it was extended to 1825 to accommodate the large family.

Publications

The Difficulties Which Surround the Practice of Religion (1785)
Statistical Account of the Parish

Trivia

In the heart of "Burns Country" during Burns' lifetime, McQuhae is referred to in Robert Burns' poem "The Twa Herds" aka "The Holy Tulzie".

References
 

1737 births
1823 deaths
People from Ayrshire
18th-century Ministers of the Church of Scotland
19th-century Ministers of the Church of Scotland